The 2004 Beach Soccer World Championships was the tenth and final edition of the Beach Soccer World Championships, the most prestigious competition in international beach soccer contested by men's national teams; the following year, the competition was replaced by the second iteration of a world cup in beach soccer, the better known FIFA Beach Soccer World Cup. It was organized by Brazilian sports agency Koch Tavares in cooperation with and under the supervision of Beach Soccer Worldwide (BSWW), the sports governing body.

The tournament took place at Copacabana Beach in Rio de Janeiro, Brazil, specifically at the purpose-built Copacabana Arena which had a capacity of 10,000. The main sponsor was McDonald's.

Brazil successfully defended their title by again beating Spain, in consecutive finals.

Organisation
The format was changed back to how the tournament was played between 1999 and 2001. This meant increasing the number of participants back up to twelve teams and splitting them up into four groups of three nations contested in a round robin format. The top two teams from each group progressed into the quarter finals from which point on the championship proceeded as a knock-out tournament until the winner was crowned, with an additional third place deciding match.

Teams

Qualification
European teams gained qualification by finishing in the top four spots of the 2003 Euro Beach Soccer League. South American teams were hand-picked based on recent performances. The other entries received wild-card invites.

Africa, Asia and Oceania were unrepresented.

Entrants

European Zone (7):

1
WC
WC
1,WC

North American Zone (1):
WC

South American Zone (3):

Hosts:
 (South America)

Draw
The teams were split into three pots in reflection of their similar circumstances. The draw to assign one nation from each pot into the four groups took place on January 29 in Sao Paulo and was conducted by BSWW.

Group stage
Matches are listed as local time in Rio de Janeiro, (UTC-3)

Group A

Group B

Group C

Group D

Knockout stage
March 3 and 5 were allocated as rest days.

Quarter finals

Semi-finals

Third place play-off

Final

Winners

Awards

Top goalscorers

12 goals
 Madjer
10 goals
 Benjamin
7 goals
 Alan
 Jorginho
 Amarelle
6 goals
 Junior Negão
5 goals
 Buru
 Neném
 Fruzzetti
4 goals
 Belchior
 Juninho
 Nico
3 goals
 Eloy
 David
2 goals
 Rodriguez
 Meier
 Bustillo
 Nico 
 Galli
 dos Santos
 Cardoso
 Ottavy
 Samoun
 Baumi
 Petrasso
 Belme
 Martin
 Victor
 Camilo
 Ricardo Loja
 Cantona
 Schirinzi
 Sergio
 Bruno
 Hernani
32 others scored 1 goal each

Final standings

References

Sources
RSSSF
roonba
BSWW
Scorers
Awards

2004
2004
2004 in beach soccer
2004 in Brazilian football